Joachim Krause-Wichmann (27 May 1930 – 7 July 2000) was a German rower. He competed in the men's coxless four event at the 1952 Summer Olympics, representing Saar.

References

External links
 

1930 births
2000 deaths
German male rowers
Olympic rowers of Saar
Rowers at the 1952 Summer Olympics
Sportspeople from Trier